|}

The Queen Elizabeth II Stakes is a Group 1 flat horse race in Great Britain open to horses aged three years or older. It is run at Ascot over a distance of 1 mile (1,609 metres), and it is scheduled to take place as part of British Champions Day each year in October.

History
The event was established in 1955, and it was originally held in September. It was created when a race called the Knights' Royal Stakes was renamed in honour of Queen Elizabeth II. The first three winners were all trained in France.

The present system of race grading was introduced in 1971, and the "QEII" was initially given Group 2 status. It was promoted to Group 1 level in 1987.

The race was added to the Breeders' Cup Challenge series in 2008. From this point the winner earned an automatic invitation to compete in the Breeders' Cup Mile. It was removed from the series in 2012.

The Queen Elizabeth II Stakes was switched to October in 2011. It became part of a new fixture called British Champions Day, and its prize fund was increased fourfold to £1,000,000. It now serves as the mile-category final of the British Champions Series.

Records
Most successful horse (2 wins):
 Brigadier Gerard – 1971, 1972
 Rose Bowl – 1975, 1976

Leading jockey (8 wins):
 Willie Carson – Rose Bowl (1975, 1976), Trusted (1977), Homing (1978), Known Fact (1980), Teleprompter (1984), Lahib (1992), Bahri (1995)

Leading trainer (5 wins):
 Saeed bin Suroor – Mark of Esteem (1996), Dubai Millennium (1999), Summoner (2001), Ramonti (2007), Poet's Voice (2010)

Leading owner (5 wins):
 Godolphin – Mark of Esteem (1996), Dubai Millennium (1999), Summoner (2001), Ramonti (2007), Poet's Voice (2010)

Winners since 1970

Earlier winners

Knights' Royal Stakes

 1947: Tudor Minstrel
 1948: Djelal
 1949: Wat Tyler
 1950: Hyperbole
 1951: Leading Light
 1952: Tudor Castle
 1953: King of the Tudors
 1954: Umberto

Queen Elizabeth II Stakes

 1955: Hafiz
 1956: Cigalon
 1957: Midget
 1958: Major Portion
 1959: Rosalba
 1960: Sovereign Path 
 1961: Le Levanstell
 1962: Romulus
 1963: The Creditor 
 1964: Linacre
 1965: Derring-Do
 1966: Hill Rise
 1967: Reform
 1968: World Cup
 1969: Jimmy Reppin

See also
 Horse racing in Great Britain
 List of British flat horse races

References

 Paris-Turf: 

 Racing Post:

 galopp-sieger.de – Queen Elizabeth II Stakes (ex Knights' Royal Stakes).
 horseracingintfed.com – International Federation of Horseracing Authorities – Queen Elizabeth II Stakes (2018).
 pedigreequery.com – Queen Elizabeth II Stakes – Ascot.
 
 Race Recordings 

Flat races in Great Britain
Ascot Racecourse
Open mile category horse races
Recurring sporting events established in 1955
British Champions Series
1955 establishments in England